Mithila Minority Dental College And Hospital(MMDCH)() is the second-oldest dental college in the Indian state of Bihar and the oldest dental college in the region of Mithila established in 1989. The college is affiliated to Lalit Narayan Mithila University.

Courses offered
 BDS (Bachelor of Dental Surgery) - 60 seats
 MDS (Master of Surgery) in all clinical departments
 Dental Hygienist
 Dental Mechanic

Upcoming courses
 PhD in all six clinical departments
 Fellowship in Esthetic Dentistry
 Fellowship in Implants and Laser Dentistry
 Fellowship in Contemporary Endodontics
 Advanced fellowship in Cosmetic Surgery

External links
 

Dental colleges in India
Hospitals in Bihar
Education in Darbhanga
Lalit Narayan Mithila University
Colleges affiliated to Lalit Narayan Mithila University
1989 establishments in Bihar
Hospitals established in 1989
Educational institutions established in 1989
Universities and colleges in Bihar